Dragoș Iliescu (born November 5, 1974) is a Romanian academic. He has been the Chair of the Doctoral School of Psychology and Educational Science since 2017.

Education 

Iliescu was born in Brașov, where he attended the Grigore Moisil National College of Computer Science. In 1997 he graduated from National Intelligence Academy in Bucharest with a bachelor's degree in socio-psychology. In 2003 he obtained a Ph.D. degree in psychology from the Babeș-Bolyai University with the thesis "Psychosocial Aspects of Organizational Change" under the direction of Professor Horia Pitariu. He specialized in 2 areas: (a) psychometrics, psychological and educational assessment, tests and testing, and (b) work and organizational psychology.

Service in scientific organizations 
Iliescu is a co-founder of the Romanian Association of Industrial and Organizational Psychology (APIO). He served two terms as a council member, from 2002 to 2010 and again from 2013 to 2020, and one term as the association's president, from 2010 to 2013. Apart from the APIO, he has been a staff member of the International Test Commission since 2008, variously serving as council member, secretary-general, and president. His service as president is the highest position in a professional international association to be held by a Romanian. In 2018, he was recognized for his contributions to the International Test Commission and was named a "Fellow of the ITC."

As of May 2019, Iliescu is the Treasurer of the European Association for Work and Organizational Psychology. He is currently an associate editor for the European Journal of Psychological Assessment and will serve a two-year term as editor-in-chief beginning on January 1, 2021.

Entrepreneurship 
Iliescu has founded and managed businesses that use psychology applied in different settings to offer professional services. In 1999, he founded D&D research, a market research company. In 2003, he founded Testcentral Romania, which is now the primary publisher of psychological tests in Romania. He resigned his position as CEO in 2015. In 2012, he founded 42 Organizational Assessment, a talent assessment company. In 2016, he founded Brio Romania, which has become the primary platform for standardized testing in Romania. He currently works as the chief scientist and as a managing partner for Brio.

Research 
Iliescu's research addresses emotional intelligence and its relationship to occupational stress. He has hypothesized that emotional intelligence is not associated with job or school performance, does not provide speed or accuracy in processing emotions, is not related to memory, solving problems, argumentation, and is not a skill. He believes that emotional intelligence contributes to an improved quality of life and that it can be used as a predictor of overall happiness.

In 2017, Illescu authored the book Adapting Tests in Linguistic and Cultural Situations, which was published by Cambridge University Press. The volume provides a step-by-step approach to cross-cultural test adaptation and provides reasons why adapting standardized tests to different cultures is important.

In 2020, he was co-author of Time and generational changes in cognitive performance in Romania along with George Gunnesch-Luca, which is the largest study of its kind ever published in Romania. It describes the Flynn effect in Romania and analyzes the test results of 12,000 Romanians.

References 

Babeș-Bolyai University alumni
Romanian psychologists
People from Brașov
1974 births
Living people
Academic staff of Babeș-Bolyai University
Psychometricians
Academic journal editors